Ângelo Marcos da Silva or simply Ângelo (born 8 January 1975 in Abaeté) is a former Brazilian football player.

His debut in the Russian Football Premier League was very successful, he scored a hat-trick against FC Torpedo Moscow and was named player of the month for March 2001. However, he could not sustain the high level of play for a significant period.

Some sources list him playing in Bulgaria for PFC Cherno More Varna after leaving the Russian league, but that is possibly confusion with Marcos da Silva.

References

External links
 

1975 births
Living people
Brazilian footballers
Mirassol Futebol Clube players
PFC Krylia Sovetov Samara players
FC Spartak Vladikavkaz players
PFC Cherno More Varna players
Brazilian expatriate footballers
Expatriate footballers in Russia
Expatriate footballers in Bulgaria
Russian Premier League players
First Professional Football League (Bulgaria) players
Association football forwards
Sportspeople from Minas Gerais